Valence Industries was the company that owned the Uley Graphite Project and associated facilities near Port Lincoln in regional South Australia. The project is one of the largest coarse flake graphite deposits in the world, and is acknowledged as a significant area of graphite mineralisation. Valence Industries changed its name to Quantum Graphite Limited on 14 July 2017. The company's shares are suspended from trading and it is subject to a deed of company arrangement.

As the owner of the project, Valence, now Quantum, is Australia’s only graphite producer. The project has all approvals required to commence production at the Uley mine, and the mine was formally opened in November 2014. The project has a high grade Ore Reserve   A Feasibility Study for the significant expansion of operations at the Uley graphite site was released in early 2015. This proposes the expansion of its base flake graphite concentrate production and also the establishment of an advance graphite manufacturing facility.

Valence Industries’ aim is to produce graphite products for multiple applications and multiple industries for sale to global markets, including the Asia Pacific region, Europe and North America.

Project overview

The Uley graphite project is located near the major regional town of Port Lincoln, in the Lower Eyre Peninsula in South Australia.

The project contains near surface, disseminated, high-grade flake graphite. The project comprises two Mining Licences and two associated Retention Licences, plus an extensive Exploration Licence which provides the opportunity for project expansion in the future.

Valence owns the land on which its current operations are conducted, including extensive existing infrastructure. It also owns the land where proposed expanded operations would be carried out.

Project history
Graphite was discovered in the area of the Uley project in the early 1800s  and was mined intermittently at the site since the 1920s. When in production, the open cut mine was capable of producing up to 14,000 tonnes of graphite concentrate annually. It was placed on care and maintenance in 1993 and was not worked again until 2014, when Valence reported the first sales of graphite from the mine under its ownership had taken place. These initial sales were for advanced qualification and testing purposes ahead of proposed long term sales contracts.

References

External links 
Valence Industries website

Graphite mines in Australia
Mining companies of Australia